Bharamgouda Alagouda Kage or Raju Kage is an Indian politician. He was elected to the Karnataka Legislative Assembly from Kagwad 4 times consecutively before getting defeated by Shrimant Patil twice in 2018 Assembly election and 2019 by-election.

Education
He completed BSc graduation from R.L.S. College, Belagavi affiliated with Karnatak University, Dharwad in 1980.

Political career
He contested from Athani as a Janata Party candidate and was defeated by Pawar Desai Sidharaj of Indian National Congress in 1983.
He became a member of Gram Panchayat in 1993.
He was elected to Belagavi Zilla Panchayat in 1995.
He contested from Kagwad in 1999 as an Independent candidate and was defeated by Pasagouda Urf Popat Appagoda Patil of Indian National Congress.
He was elected to the Karnataka Legislative Assembly from Kagwad for the first time in the 2000 Karnataka Legislative Assembly by-election as Janata Dal (United) candidate. Later he joined Bharatiya Janata Party and was elected from the same constituency in 2004, 2008, 2013.
He was defeated by Shrimant Patil of Indian National Congress in 2018 Assembly Elections. Meanwhile Shrimant Patil resigned and contested again in 2019 Karnataka Legislative Assembly by-elections on BJP ticket. Raju Kage had joined Indian National Congress and was defeated by Shrimant Patil who contested from Bharatiya Janata Party.

Arrest
He was arrested for attacking a Congress worker in Belagavi in 2017.

References

1958 births
Living people
Janata Dal (United) politicians
Bharatiya Janata Party politicians from Karnataka
Indian National Congress politicians from Karnataka
People from Belgaum
Karnataka MLAs 2013–2018
Karnataka MLAs 1999–2004
Karnataka MLAs 2004–2007
Karnataka MLAs 2008–2013